The 2006 European Korfball Championship was held in Budapest (Hungary) with 8 national teams in competition, from April 16 to 22.

First round

Final round 

5th-8th places

Semifinals

Finals matches

Final standings

See also
European Korfball Championship
International Korfball Federation

External links
Hungary 2006 website
International Korfball Federation

European Korfball Championship
2006 in korfball
Korfball in Hungary
International sports competitions in Budapest
2000s in Budapest
2006 in Hungarian sport
International sports competitions hosted by Hungary
April 2006 sports events in Europe